Romagnano may refer to:

Romagnano al Monte, Italian municipality of the province of Salerno
Romagnano Sesia, Italian municipality of the province of Novara